The Scarlet and the Black is a 1983 Italian-American international co-production made-for-television historical war drama film directed by Jerry London, and starring Gregory Peck and Christopher Plummer. Based on J. P. Gallagher's book The Scarlet Pimpernel of the Vatican (published in 1967), the film tells the story of Monsignor Hugh O'Flaherty, a real-life Irish Catholic priest who saved thousands of Jews and escaped Allied POWs in Rome. CBS distributed more than 500,000 scripts of The Scarlet and the Black to students in elementary and high schools throughout the country, to be read aloud in class to stimulate student interest in English and history. The title The Scarlet and the Black is a reference not only to the black cassock and scarlet sash worn by Monsignores and bishops in the Catholic Church, but also to the dominant colors of Nazi Party regalia.

Plot
In September 1943, the German army occupies Rome following Italy's surrender to the Allies. Pope Pius XII meets General Max Helm and SS Head of Police for Rome Lieutenant Colonel Herbert Kappler. The Colonel expresses concern that escaped Allied prisoners may attempt to seek refuge in the Vatican, and requests permission to paint a white line across St. Peter's Square in order to mark the extent of Vatican sovereignty. The Pope does not protest, but when the SS officers leave, he sees out of the window that the white line had already begun to be painted.

Opposing Kappler is Monsignor O'Flaherty, an Irish-born Vatican priest who runs an underground organization which provides safe haven and escape to escaped POWs, Jews, and refugees in Rome. O'Flaherty is assisted in this enterprise by others, including locals, the clergy and members of the Vatican's diplomatic corps. The Nazis attempt to destroy the group, but Kappler is frustrated by O'Flaherty's successes, due to his cleverness, disguises, and his straining the limits of the Vatican's neutrality.

Met with continuous failure, Kappler begins to develop a personal vendetta against O'Flaherty. Despite O'Flaherty's efforts, Kappler manages to recapture many escaped POWs, deport many Jews to death camps, and exploit and oppress the general population; a number of O'Flaherty's friends are also arrested or killed. O'Flaherty is himself the target of an assassination attempt instigated by Kappler, which however fails due to the monsignor's boxing skills. The rescue organization continues operating, and succeeds in saving many lives.

As the war progresses, the Allies succeed in landing in Italy and begin to overcome German resistance, eventually breaking through and heading towards Rome itself. Colonel Kappler worries for his family's safety from vengeful partisans, and, in a one-to-one meeting with O'Flaherty, asks him to save his family, appealing to the same values that motivated O'Flaherty to save so many others. The Monsignor, however, declines, refusing to believe that, after all the Colonel has done and all the atrocities he is responsible for, he would expect mercy and forgiveness automatically without repentance, simply because he asks for it, and departs in disgust.

As the Allies enter Rome in June 1944, Monsignor O'Flaherty joins in the celebration of the liberation, and somberly toasts those who did not live to see it. Kappler is captured in 1945 and interrogated by the Allies. In the course of his interrogation, he is informed that his wife and children were smuggled out of Italy and escaped unharmed to Switzerland. Upon being asked who helped them, Kappler realizes who it must have been, but responds simply that he does not know.

The film epilogue states that O'Flaherty was decorated by several Allied governments after the war. Kappler was sentenced to life imprisonment, but was visited in prison every month by O'Flaherty, his only regular visitor. Eventually, the former SS officer converted to the Catholic faith, and was baptized by the Monsignor in 1959.

Cast
Vatican Officials
 Gregory Peck as Monsignor Hugh O'Flaherty
 John Gielgud as Pope Pius XII 
 Raf Vallone as Father Vittorio
 Angelo Infanti as Father Morosini
 Marne Maitland as Papal Secretary
 Stelio Candelli as O'Flaherty's Secretary
 Gabriella D'Olive as Mother Superior

SS Personnel
 Christopher Plummer as SS-Obersturmbannführer Herbert Kappler
 Kenneth Colley as SS-Hauptsturmführer Hirsch (representing Erich Priebke) (as Ken Colley)
 Walter Gotell as SS-Obergruppenführer Max Helm (representing Karl Wolff)
 Michael Byrne as Reinhard Beck
 T. P. McKenna as Reichsführer Heinrich Himmler
 David Brandon as SS officer

Allied Personnel

 John Terry as Lt. Jack Manning
 Phillip Hatton as Lt. Harry Barnett
 Mark Lewis as Cpl. Les Tate
 William Berger as U.S. Intelligence Officer (as Bill Berger)
 Edmund Purdom as British Intelligence Officer / Epilogue Narrator (as Edmond Purdom)

Civilians
 Barbara Bouchet as Minna Kappler
 Julian Holloway as Alfred West (John May)
 Olga Karlatos as Francesca Lombardo (representing Chetta Chevalier)
 Vernon Dobtcheff as Count Langenthal (representing Count Demetris Sarsfield Salazar)
 Peter Burton as Sir D'Arcy Osborne
Fabiana Udenio as Guila Lombardo
 Remo Remotti as Rabbi Leoni
 Giovanni Crippa as Simon Weiss
 Billy Boyle as Paddy Doyle
 Itaco Nardulli as Franz Kappler
 Cariddi Nardulli as Liesel Kappler (as Carridi Nardulli)
 Alessandra Cozzo as Emilia Lombardo
 Cesarina Tacconi as Pregnant Woman
 Sergio Nicolai as Firing Squad Officer
 Bruno Corazzari as Coalman
 Francesco Carnelutti as Cameriere Segreto

Historical accuracy
Monsignor Hugh O'Flaherty was a real Irish-born priest and Vatican official, credited with saving 6,500 Jews and Allied war prisoners.

The portrayal of Pope Pius XII is notable. He "answers questions that the film hasn't even raised. The world, in fact, didn't raise the questions until the 1960s." Answering protests that came decades later, including by Rolf Hochhuth's play The Deputy and the writings of Hannah Arendt, the film wrestles with the role of the Holy See in the War at multiple points. During the conclusion of the film, Pope Pius XII tells O'Flaherty: 'In my heart I honor you'.

The character of General Max Helm was based entirely on the real life of SS-Obergruppenführer Karl Wolff, who served in 1944 as the Supreme SS and Police Leader of Italy.  The film was unable to use Wolff's real name, since the former SS general was still living when the film was in production; he died in 1984.

Herbert Kappler converted from Protestant to Catholic in 1949; however, that fact only became known in 1959.

Herbert Kappler was instrumental in carrying out the Ardeatine massacre, one of the worst World War II atrocities on Italian soil. His life imprisonment sentence was largely in relation to that crime. He was eventually transferred to a prison hospital on account of poor health. It was there that he was smuggled out in a suitcase by his wife in 1977 (Kappler weighed less than 105 pounds at the time). He escaped to West Germany, where he died at age 70 in 1978.

Actor Christopher Plummer was 53 years old during the production of the film.  Herbert Kappler was only 36 when he served as SS Security Chief in Rome.

Awards
During the 35th Primetime Emmy Awards, the film was nominated in the categories of Outstanding Individual Achievement - graphic design and title sequences for Phil Norman, Outstanding Film Editing for a Limited Series or a Special for Benjamin Weissman and winning for Outstanding Film Sound Mixing for a Limited Series or a Special for Gordon L. Day, John Mitchell, Stanley A. Wetzel and Howard Wilmarth.

References

External links

 
 
 Planet Review Blog for The Scarlet and the Black
 The Movie Scene for The Scarlet and the Black

1983 television films
1983 films
1980s war drama films
1980s historical drama films
Films about Catholicism
American historical drama films
American war drama films
Italian Campaign of World War II films
Films directed by Jerry London
Films set in Vatican City
Films about Catholic priests
Films about Nazis
Films about Nazism
Films scored by Ennio Morricone
ITC Entertainment films
CBS network films
Cultural depictions of Heinrich Himmler
Cultural depictions of Pope Pius XII
1980s American films
American World War II films
World War II films based on actual events